"Tuesday's Gone" is the second track on Lynyrd Skynyrd's debut album, (Pronounced 'Lĕh-'nérd 'Skin-'nérd). It also appears on the band's first live LP, One More from the Road.

Production
Al Kooper adds upfront Mellotron string sounds to the chorus of the song. It is one of a few Lynyrd Skynyrd songs on which Bob Burns, one of the original founding members and drummer, did not play. Atlanta Rhythm Section's drummer Robert Nix played on the studio version. Bob Burns, however, can be heard playing on the demo version from the same session.

Cover versions 
Metallica covered "Tuesday's Gone" on the album Garage Inc., which features special appearances by Gary Rossington on guitar, Pepper Keenan from Corrosion of Conformity, John Popper from Blues Traveler, Les Claypool from Primus and Jerry Cantrell from Alice in Chains.

References 

1973 songs
Lynyrd Skynyrd songs
Metallica songs
Rock ballads
Songs about trains
Song recordings produced by Al Kooper
Songs written by Allen Collins
Songs written by Ronnie Van Zant
Ty Cobb